is a Japanese word that indicates the violation of legal, social or religious rules. It is most often used in the religious and moral sense. Originally, the word indicated a divine punishment due to the violation of a divine taboo through evil deeds, defilement (kegare) or disasters. When translated in English as "sin", the term covers therefore only one of the three meanings of the Japanese word.

History
In ancient Japan the word thus indicated not only crimes and other forbidden human actions, but also diseases, disasters, pollution, ugliness and any other unpleasant object or fact. 
 
The first category deals with infractions against property, the second mainly with infractions against people. Some of the tsumi have to do with disease and natural disasters, and are not therefore sins in the modern sense, but order perturbations (kegare) which had to be dealt with and solved by the person or persons concerned in certain ways, for example through purification rites called harae.

See also
 Harae
 Kegare

References

Shinto in Japan
Shinto and society